is a 2010 Japanese romantic drama film directed by Takaomi Ogata.

Cast
 Chavetaro Ishizaki
 Rin Sakuragi

References

External links
 
 Chavetaro Ishizaki Official website

2011 romantic drama films
2011 films
Films directed by Takaomi Ogata
Japanese romantic drama films
2010s Japanese films
2010s Japanese-language films